Carlos Romeu Müller (17 May 1948 – 24 July 2021), better known as Romeu, was a Spanish graphic humorist.

Biography 
Romeu was, together with Tom and J. L. Martín, one of the founders, in 1977, of the Spanish weekly satirical magazine El Jueves.

His comic strip Miguelito was published daily, including the Sunday supplement, in the Spanish daily newspaper El País from the paper's foundation in 1976 until 2009.

Romeu was a recipient of the 2011 Gat Perich International Humor Prize.

References

External links
 Lambiek Comiclopedia page.

1948 births
2021 deaths
Spanish comics artists
Spanish cartoonists
Spanish satirists
Spanish humorists
Artists from Barcelona
20th-century Spanish artists